Wales at the 1934 British Empire Games was abbreviated WAL. They have competed in every edition of the Commonwealth Games.

Wales double their medal tally from the first games, but failed to take a gold medal.

Wales came 8th overall in the games.

Runner Reg Thomas did not compete for Wales, because of English objections (he had competed for England at the 1930 British Empire Games).

Medals

Gold
None

Silver
Albert Barnes, Boxing - Men's Bantamweight Division (54 kg)
J.D. Jones, Boxing - Men's Featherweight Division (57 kg)
N.F. Taylor, Boxing - Men's Lightweight Division (60 kg)

Bronze
J. Pottinger, Boxing - Men's Flyweight Division (51 kg)
S. Weaver & T.R. Davies - Lawn Bowls - Men's Doubles
Valerie Davies - Swimming - Women's 100 Yards Backstroke

See also
 Wales at the Commonwealth Games

References

1934
Nations at the 1934 British Empire Games
Com